Scimitar Airlines was a British charter airline between 1978 and 1982 with a head office in Lowfield Heath on the south perimeter of Gatwick Airport. It briefly operated cargo charters to west and central Africa and the middle east before financial problems caused it to cease flying.

History

The company was formed in January 1975 as Gullcroft Limited by a former managing director of British Caledonian. With a change of name to Scimitar Airlines Limited the company applied for a cargo charter licence in January 1978, due to objections from British Caledonian and other British cargo airlines Transmeridian Air Cargo and Tradewinds Airways the Civil Aviation Authority held a public hearing into the application.

The airline hire-purchased two second-hand Boeing 707s in a convertible passenger/cargo configuration to start cargo operations.

In July 1979 the two 707s were wet-leased to IAS Cargo Airlines (later British Cargo Airlines) and in August 1979 the airline considered applying for a licence to carry passengers.
 
Operations were suspended in 1980 when the company licences were withdrawn by the Civil Aviation Authority because the Government of the day required that the carrier be majority British owned (It was owned by 2 Saudi Brothers), in 1981 it was hoped that the company could be re-financed and to restart operations but it went into liquidation in early 1982.

Fleet
2 x Boeing 707-320C

See also
 List of defunct airlines of the United Kingdom

References

Defunct airlines of the United Kingdom
Airlines established in 1978
Airlines disestablished in 1982